Charles Giles Clarke  (born 29 May 1953) is an English businessman and cricket administrator, and former chairman of the England and Wales Cricket Board.

Early life and education
Born in Bristol, Clarke was educated at Rugby School. He then studied at Oriel College, Oxford where he graduated with an MA in Persian with Arabic; reportedly he paid his way by gambling. He then spent a year at the University of Damascus Arabic language school.

Business career
Clarke began his career as an investment banker with Credit Suisse First Boston. In 1981 he bought from receivership the assets of what was to become Majestic Wine, where, as chairman, he built it into a UK national chain. From August 1987 to May 1988, Clarke was chairman of Majestic Wine Corporation Inc, a United States company which owned a chain of 104 stores trading as Liquor Barn in California and Arizona. Following disposal of the US based businesses, he sold the UK plc business of Majestic Wines for £15 million in 1989.

In 1990, Clarke founded Pet City, where, as CEO, he built it into a chain of 94 stores (also dressing up at Christmas in the Swindon Store). After making the business public in 1995, he sold the business for £150 million in 1996 to US based PetsMart. In 1998, Clarke founded Safestore, building it into the UK's third largest self storage company, selling it to Bridgepoint Capital for £44million in August 2003.
In 1999 Mr Clarke became CEO of Stepstone, an online career portal. Since he came on board, the company has raised NKr1.8bn ($197m) from the IPO in 2000 and grew from four countries and 200 employees to a staff of 1,385 in 18 countries.

Clarke is currently chairman and controlling shareholder, via his company Westleigh Investments, of:
ATL Telecom – Cardiff based data transmission design equipment company, which manufactures in China
Fosters Event Catering – a West Country-based independent caterer
CCI International – the UK's largest clay pigeon equipment manufacturer
West Country Business Systems – develops software systems for managing independent schools.
Boston Tea Party – a West Country-based chain of coffee shops
Clarke was the non-executive chairman of Pure Wafer plc – presently the only European based silicon chip test wafer reclaim company

Clarke is also Chairman of oil and gas explorer Amerisur Resources PLC (formerly known as Chaco Resources,)

Public service
Giles Clarke has served with the following public bodies:
2002–2007 As a National Council member of the Learning and Skills Council, the largest quango in the UK with a budget of £10 billion, responsible for all UK adult learning. and a member of the Adult Learning Committee, a statutory body set up by the UK Parliament.
Clarke was Deputy Chair of the EU Task Force on Skills and Mobility and presented its report to the Barcelona Summit in 2002.
Deputy Chairman of the Bristol Old Vic theatre until 2007.
Patron of Changing Faces, the UK national charity supporting and representing people with disfigurement.
In 2010/11, Clarke was elected as Master of the private club the Society of Merchant Venturers in Bristol. The society conducts charitable works, but has been accused of using its present influence to sanitise the memory of Edward Colston.

Cricket
A keen club cricketer, Clarke became chairman of Somerset County Cricket Club, becoming instrumental in developing the club both on and off field and consulting ex cricketers including Sir Ian Botham. He resultantly became a non-executive director of the England and Wales Cricket Board, and as Chairman of Marketing led the negotiations for their new four-year TV and radio broadcasting rights deal signed with BSkyB, Five and the BBC in December 2004. On 25 September 2007 Clarke was voted in as Chairman of the ECB, re-elected in 2009, and again in March 2012 for a further three years. In April 2015 Clarke was nominated as the ECB's first president, with the intention that president's primary role would be to represent ECB on the International Cricket Council's executive board.

Clarke was appointed Commander of the Order of the British Empire (CBE) in the 2012 New Year Honours for services to cricket.

During his tenure as chief executive of the ECB, Clarke attracted considerable controversy surrounding the Stanford Super Series, which was bankrolled by the now convicted American financier Allen Stanford, who offered a $20million dollar winner takes all match against the Stanford Superstars which was made up of players from the West Indies. Although England had a warm up match against the West Indies as part of the Super Series, members of the England Team captained by Kevin Pietersen felt that they were undercooked prior to the match and felt uncomfortable prior to the match which they would go onto lose against the Superstars by 10 wickets.

While featured in archive interviews and footage as part of a three part Sky Documentary series entitled 'The Man Who Bought Cricket' Clarke declined to participate in this documentary.

Private life
Married to Judy, the couple have a son Jack – after whom the brasserie in Bristol is named. A family man and protective of his private life, when his name appeared in the Sunday Times Rich List in the mid-1990s, Clarke took steps to protect his financial interests from the public.

References

External links
Bio at the Learning & Skills Council
Bio at CricInfo.com
Safestore Self Storage 
ByStored
ATL Telecom
Westleigh Investments Biog
Debrett's People of Today

1953 births
Living people
British retail company founders
Businesspeople from Bristol
People educated at Rugby School
Alumni of Oriel College, Oxford
20th-century English businesspeople
Somerset County Cricket Club
English cricket administrators
Commanders of the Order of the British Empire
Damascus University alumni
Members of the Society of Merchant Venturers
21st-century English businesspeople